Khipa (also Khebe) is a tutelary deity of the Hurrians and Hittites. This may be an archaic name for the goddess Ma.

See also

 Hittite mythology
 Hurrian mythology

References
 Michael Jordan, Encyclopedia of Gods, Kyle Cathie Limited, 2002

Hurrian deities
Hittite deities
Tutelary deities